Putative tyrosine-protein phosphatase auxilin is an enzyme that in humans is encoded by the DNAJC6 gene.

Function 

DNAJC6 belongs to the evolutionarily conserved DNAJ/HSP40 family of proteins, which regulate molecular chaperone activity by stimulating ATPase activity. DNAJ proteins may have up to 3 distinct domains: a conserved 70-amino acid J domain, usually at the N terminus, a glycine/phenylalanine (G/F)-rich region, and a cysteine-rich domain containing 4 motifs resembling a zinc-finger domain (Ohtsuka and Hata, 2000).

Structure 

The protein tyrosine phosphatase domain and C2 domain pair of auxilin, located near the N-terminus of the polypeptide, constitute a superdomain, a tandem arrangement of two or more nominally unrelated domains that form a single heritable unit. The phosphatase domain belongs to the auxilin subfamily of lipid phosphatases and is predicted to be catalytically inactive.

References

External links

Further reading 

 
 
 
 

Heat shock proteins
Co-chaperones